Xanadu Hills are a ridge of hills lying between Ward Valley and the Alph River in Victoria Land, a region of Antarctica.  They were named by the New Zealand Geographic Board in 1994 in connection with the adjacent Alph River, an earlier name inspired by a poem of Samuel Taylor Coleridge, Kubla Khan.

References

Hills of Victoria Land
Scott Coast